Bababe is a department of Brakna Region in Mauritania.

List of municipalities in the department 
The Bababe department is made up of following municipalities:

 Aéré M'Bar
 Bababé
 El Verae.

In 2000, the entire population of the Bababe Department has a total of 33 672 inhabitants  (16 139 men and 17 533 women).

References 

Departments of Mauritania